Antonella Bevilacqua (born 15 October 1971 in Foggia) is an Italian high jumper, whose personal best jump was 1.98 metres, achieved in May 1996 in Milan.

Biography
In 1996 Bevilacqua tested positive for the prohibited substances ephedrine and pseudoephedrine twice during the same month. The IAAF decided to put the case to arbitration and allowed Bevilaqua to compete at that year's Olympics where she cleared 1.99m to finish 4th. However, after the games it was decided that a doping offence had been committed and her Olympic result was annulled.

The athlete was however only disqualified for three months and was able to return to competitions already with the beginning of the 1997 indoor season in which she immediately won the national title.

National records
 High jump indoor: 1.98 m ( Athens, 24 February 1994) - record holder until 13 February 2007.

Achievements

National titles
Antonella Bevilacqua has won 13 times the individual national championship.
6 wins in the high jump (1992, 1993, 1994, 1996, 1997, 2003)
7 wins in the high jump indoor (1991, 1993, 1994, 1996, 1997, 2000, 2004)

See also
Italian all-time top lists - High jump
List of sportspeople sanctioned for doping offences

Notes

References

External links
 

1971 births
Living people
Italian female high jumpers
Athletes (track and field) at the 1992 Summer Olympics
Athletes (track and field) at the 1996 Summer Olympics
Olympic athletes of Italy
Doping cases in athletics
Italian sportspeople in doping cases
Sportspeople from Foggia
Mediterranean Games gold medalists for Italy
Athletes (track and field) at the 1997 Mediterranean Games
World Athletics Championships athletes for Italy
Italian masters athletes
Mediterranean Games medalists in athletics